DVE or Dve may refer to:

Digital video effect, transitions from one screen to another
 Domestic violent extremist, a type of person involved in home-grown violent extremism
 Duck Viral Enteritis (Duck Plague) a high mortality, very virulent, highly transmissible disease
Driver's Vision Enhancer,  compound viewing system used to enhance a driver's viewing capabilities during degraded visual conditions
 WDVE, a radio station in Pittsburgh, Pennsylvania
 De vulgari eloquentia, an essay by Dante Alighieri on the relationship between Latin and vernacular
 Dvĕ vdovy, The Two Widows, a two-act Czech opera by Bedřich Smetana.

See also

 DVA (disambiguation)